Holli Wheeler (born 28 January 1990) is an Australian rugby league footballer who plays as a er for the St George Illawarra Dragons in the NRL Women's Premiership and the North Sydney Bears in the NSWRL Women's Premiership.

She is an Australian and New South Wales representative.

Background
Born in Taree, New South Wales, Wheeler began playing rugby league for the Old Bar Pirates.

Playing career

2018
In June, Wheeler represented NSW Country at the Women's National Championships. On 22 June, Wheeler made her State of Origin debut for New South Wales in their 16–10 win over Queensland.

On 27 June, Wheeler joined the St George Illawarra Dragons NRL Women's Premiership team. In Round 1 of the 2018 NRL Women's season, she made her debut for the Dragons in a 4–30 loss to the Brisbane Broncos. On 3 October, she was named the inaugural Dragons' Women's Player of the Year.

On 6 October, she represented the Prime Minister's XIII in a 40–4 win over Papua New Guinea. A week later, she made her Test debut for Australia in their 26–24 win over New Zealand.

2019
In May, Wheeler represented NSW Country at the Women's National Championships. On 21 June, she came off the bench in New South Wales' 14–4 win over Queensland.

On 25 October, she came off the bench in Australia's 28–8 win over New Zealand at WIN Stadium.

2020
In February, Wheeler tore her anterior cruciate ligament (ACL) at the NRL Nines, ruling her out for the season.

References

External links
St George Illawarra Dragons profile

1990 births
Living people
Australian female rugby league players
Australia women's national rugby league team players
Rugby league second-rows
Rugby league locks
St. George Illawarra Dragons (NRLW) players